The Bimont Dam is a dam in Saint-Marc-Jaumegarde near Aix-en-Provence in France. It was completed in 1951.

See also 

 Renewable energy in France

References

External links

Buildings and structures in Bouches-du-Rhône
Dams completed in 1951
Arch dams
1951 establishments in France
Hydroelectric power stations in France